Russell Simmons Music Group or RSMG was a record label founded by hip-hop mogul and accused sexual predator Russell Simmons. It was formed in 2004 as a joint venture with Universal Music's Island Def Jam Music Group. Tony Austin was the label's president.

Simmons was reported to be unhappy with the label as it released two official albums, Rev. Run's Distortion (2005) and the soundtrack to Waist Deep (2006). In 2007, the label folded.

Roster
 Rev Run
 Black Buddafly
 DJ Green Lantern
 Lee Carr since 2005
 Short Dawg (joint venture with So So Def Records)
 Dro
 Daily Newz
 Young S. Dub
 Slim Dollars (HNV)

References

See also
 List of record labels

American record labels
Hip hop record labels
Def Jam Recordings